Anahawan is a municipality in the Philippines.

Anahawan may also refer to:
Anahawan, Bato
Anahawan, Sibagat